Assumpção is a surname of Portuguese origin. Notable people with this surname include:

 Anelis Assumpção, Brazilian singer-songwriter 
 Itamar Assumpção, Brazilian songwriter and composer
 Leandro Assumpção, Brazilian footballer 
 Mateus Vital (born Mateus da Silva Vital Assumpção), Brazilian footballer 

Portuguese-language surnames